Jimmy Dean Foods is a food company that was founded in 1969 by country singer and actor Jimmy Dean. It was purchased by Sara Lee, which then divested as part of a unit known as Hillshire Brands, which was later purchased by Tyson Foods.

History
Dean founded the Jimmy Dean Sausage brand of breakfast sausage, which was originally called "Pure Pork Sausage." The Jimmy Dean Sausage company did well, in part due to Dean's own extemporized, good-humored commercials.

Dean sold the company to the Sara Lee Corporation in 1984 for $80 million. He remained involved as the company spokesman after the takeover, though Sara Lee, under the leadership of John Bryan, immediately began phasing him out of management duties. By 2002, he was no longer acting as spokesman. In 2018, after Bryan's death, the company resumed an advertising campaign featuring Dean, who had died in 2010.

Products
 Tastefuls! (discontinued)
 Fresh sausage
 Sausage links and patties
 Fresh bacon
 Full cooked bacon, sausage links, and sausage patties
 Breakfast bowls
 Sandwiches
 Jimmy Dean Skillets
 Pancake and sausage on a stick
 Omelettes
 Heat 'N Serve microwavable sausage
 Jimmy D's Breakfast
 Jimmy Dean Delights (sandwiches, bowls, and sausage)
Jimmy Dean Biscuit Roll-Ups

References

External links

Company website

Sara Lee Corporation brands
Brand name meats
Sausage companies of the United States
Tyson Foods
1984 mergers and acquisitions